Seeta Aur Geeta is an Indian television drama series that aired on NDTV Imagine. It was adapted from the Bollywood film of the same name (1972), written by Salim–Javed.  The series was produced by Sunil Bohra and directed by Maqbool Khan. It aired on NDTV Imagine from 25 May 2009 to 25 September 2009.

Plot
Set in backdrop of Mumbai, Seeta and Geeta are daughters of rich parents who get separated as children. The family maid runs off with Geeta. She grows in the middle class as the maid's daughter and becomes a bully. Seeta grows in the loving care of her parents and becomes an introvert. When her parents die in an accident, evil relatives take over her family fortune and treat her like maid.

Chaos ensues when Seeta and Geeta come face to face. They decide to exchange places. Geeta takes revenge from evil relatives posing as Seeta and Seeta lives simple life in the streets while falling in love with Seeta's thug friend Raka.

Cast

Guest appearance
 Shweta Tiwari as Raka's dream girl

Production
Initially planned for 260 episodes, it ultimately ended with only 90 episodes.

Rahil Azam was originally cast as Raka, one of the lead characters. A few episodes were produced with Azam in the role, but two months before the premiere he was suffering from malaria and was replaced by Gaurav Dixit. Azam's sequences were re-shot with Dixit before the premiere.

References

External links 
 Official Site

Imagine TV original programming
2009 Indian television series debuts
Hindi-language television shows
Indian drama television series
Television shows set in Mumbai
2009 Indian television series endings